Chukhi, or Goth Chukhi, is a village and deh in Hyderabad taluka of Hyderabad District, Sindh. As of 2017, it has a population of 7,247, in 1,460 households. It is part of the tapedar circle of Moolan.

References 

Populated places in Hyderabad District, Pakistan